The former Oskaloosa Post Office is a historic building located in Oskaloosa, Iowa, United States. Completed in 1902, the Italian Renaissance Revival structure is composed of brick with decorative details in limestone and terra cotta. Plans in 2013 to convert the building into housing fell through. In 2019, a restoration project was begun to shore up the building. It was listed on the National Register of Historic Places in 2020.

References

Government buildings completed in 1902
Oskaloosa, Iowa
Buildings and structures in Mahaska County, Iowa
National Register of Historic Places in Mahaska County, Iowa
Post office buildings on the National Register of Historic Places in Iowa
Renaissance Revival architecture in Iowa